Aarón Torlà Centelles (born 12 March 1988 in Castellón de la Plana, Valencian Community) is a Spanish footballer who plays for CF Borriol as a midfielder.

External links
 
 
 

1988 births
Living people
Sportspeople from Castellón de la Plana
Spanish footballers
Footballers from the Valencian Community
Association football midfielders
Segunda División players
Segunda División B players
Tercera División players
CD Castellón footballers
UB Conquense footballers